The president of the Republic of Korea serves as the chief executive of the government of the [[South Korea|Republic of Korea] and the commander-in-chief of the Republic of Korea Armed Forces.

Prior to the establishment of the First Republic in 1948, the Provisional Government of the Republic of Korea established in Shanghai in September 1919 as the continuation of several governments proclaimed in the aftermath of March 1st Movement earlier that year coordinated Korean people's resistance against Japan during the Japanese occupation of Korea. The legitimacy of the Provisional Government has been recognised and succeeded by South Korea in the latter's original Constitution of 1948 and the current Constitution of 1988. Nine people have served twenty-four terms as heads of state (with varying titles) of the Provisional Government between September 1919 and August 1948.

The presidential term has been set at five years since 1988. It was previously set at four years from 1948 to 1972, six years from 1972 to 1981, and seven years from 1981 to 1988. Since 1981, the president has been barred from reelection. The president must be a South Korean citizen, at least 40 years old, who has lived in South Korea for 5 years.

List of presidents

Timeline

See also

Government of South Korea
Lifespan timeline of presidents of South Korea
List of presidents of the Provisional Government of the Republic of Korea
List of presidents of South Korea by time in office
List of prime ministers of South Korea
List of monarchs of Korea
Presidential elections in South Korea
Provisional Government of the Republic of Korea
Vice President of South Korea

Notes

References

Government of South Korea
South Korea
Presidents
Presidents